Kelvin Potis (born 22 April 2000) is a Liberian football midfielder for Barrack Young Controllers FC .

References

2000 births
Living people
Liberian footballers
Liberia international footballers
Watanga FC players
Barrack Young Controllers FC players
Association football midfielders
Place of birth missing (living people)